John Kite (died 1537) was successively Archbishop of Armagh, 1513–1521, and Bishop of Carlisle, 1521–1537.

John Kite was educated at Eton College and then at King's College, Cambridge, where he was graduated Bachelor of Canon Law. He was appointed a prebendary of Exeter Cathedral and Sub-Dean of the King's Chapel, Westminster in 1510. From 1510-1518 he was prebendary of Stratton in the diocese of Salisbury.

In 1518, as archbishop, he accompanied John Bourchier, 2nd Baron Berners on an embassy to Charles I of Spain and was present at the Field of the Cloth of Gold in 1520. In 1522 he was living at Rose Castle, Cumberland when he was visited by Dr William Burbank, Archdeacon of Carlisle Cathedral, of whom he wrote to Cardinal Wolsey. His alliance with Wolsey may explain his quick promotion. He took the Oath of Supremacy in 1534.

Bibliography

General references
Joyce M. Horn, Fasti Ecclesiae Anglicanae 1300-1541: Volume 3 Salisbury Diocese, (London: Institute of Historical Research, 1962) citing Register of Edmund Audley, Bishop of Salisbury
James Wilson, 'The Seal of William Burbank', Transactions of the Cumberland and Westmoreland Antiquarian Society; Vol. XV

1537 deaths
Alumni of King's College, Cambridge
People educated at Eton College
Bishops of Carlisle
Archbishops of Armagh
16th-century English Roman Catholic bishops
16th-century Roman Catholic bishops in Ireland
Year of birth missing